Branko Dragutinović (born 8 September 1961), is a Bosnian Serb retired football defender, who last played for Herzlake in Germany’s Regionalliga Nord.

Playing career

Club
He had spent four seasons playing for Rijeka in Yugoslav First League, where he collected 122 league appearances. In late 1991, he moved to Germany, where he first played with Meppen in 2. Bundesliga.

Managerial career
After retiring as a player, Dragutinović managed several lower league sides in Germany.

References

1961 births
Living people
Serbs of Bosnia and Herzegovina
Association football defenders
Yugoslav footballers
Serbian footballers
Bosnia and Herzegovina footballers
HNK Rijeka players
SV Meppen players
VfL Herzlake players
Yugoslav First League players
2. Bundesliga players
Regionalliga players
Serbian expatriate footballers
Bosnia and Herzegovina expatriate footballers
Expatriate footballers in Germany
Serbian expatriate sportspeople in Germany
Bosnia and Herzegovina expatriate sportspeople in Germany
Bosnia and Herzegovina football managers
Bosnia and Herzegovina expatriate football managers
Expatriate football managers in Germany